Astathes purpurea is a species of beetle in the family Cerambycidae. It was described by Pascoe in 1857. It is known from Malaysia.

References

P
Beetles described in 1857